The men's long jump event at the 2019 African Games was held on 28 and 30 August in Rabat.

Medalists

Results

Qualification
Qualifying performance 7.70 (Q) or 12 best performers (q) advanced to the final.

Final

References

Long
African Games